Dario Dicochea, better known as Dario, is an American singer-songwriter and pop/dance artist.

Dario grew up in Tucson, Arizona. Early in Dario's career as a musician, Dario started working with Arie Dixon of Tommy Boy Records, who produced Dario's album "The Up Side of Down". Since then, Dario has released an additional five albums.

Four of Dario's songs "(Let the Music) Save You", "Try It!", "Point of No Return" and "Shoulda Stayed" have peaked within the Billboard Dance Club Songs chart in the United States.

Dario has performed at Gay Pride concerts throughout the United States.

Discography

Studio albums

Singles

References

External links
 Official website
 All Music Dario Biography

Year of birth missing (living people)
Living people
American male singer-songwriters
Musicians from Tucson, Arizona
Singer-songwriters from Arizona